In enzymology, an L-amino acid oxidase (LAAO) is an enzyme that catalyzes the chemical reaction

an L-amino acid + H2O + O2  a 2-oxo acid + NH3 + H2O2

The enzyme was first described in 1944 by A. Zeller and A. Maritz. Not only are LAAOs quite variable in terms of molecular mass, they also vary widely regarding stability. In a similar vein, this enzyme performs in a myriad of biological activities including apoptosis-induction, edema-induction, hemorrhaging, and inhibition or induction of platelet aggregation.

As suggested by the name of the family, LAAOs are flavoenzymes which function to catalyze the stereospecific oxidative deamination of an L-amino acid. The three substrates of the enzymatic reaction are an L-amino acid, water, and oxygen, whereas the three products are the corresponding α-keto acid (2-oxo acid), ammonia, and hydrogen peroxide. One example of the enzyme in action occurs with the conversion L-alanine into pyruvic acid (2-oxopropanoic acid), as shown in Figure 1.

Abundance

Snake Venom
Although LAAOs are present in a variety of eukaryotic and prokaryotic organisms, snake venom is a particularly rich source of the enzyme and the LAAOs are proposed to supply toxic effects upon envenomation. LAAOs that have been purified from the venoms of various snake species have proven to be the best suitors for examining this novel family of enzymes. It has been determined in most cases concerning the snake families, such as Viperidae, Crotalidae, and Elapidae, that snake venom-LAAO (sv-LAAO) constitutes about 1-9% of the total protein quantity.

Structure 
Most sv-LAAOs are reported as being homodimers with multiple subunits that have molecular weights around 50–70 kDa and the interaction between the subunits occurs via non-covalent interactions. Sv-LAAOs are present in the acidic, basic, and neutral forms of the protein. Studies that look at x-ray crystal structures have confirmed that sv-LAAOs are often found as functional dimers, with each dimer having three domains. The three domains are the substrate-binding site, FAD-binding site, and a helical domain. The substrate-binding site of the enzyme was determined to be at the base of a long funnel that extends 25 Å from the surface into the interior of the protein.  It has also been determined that the FAD prosthetic group becomes deeply entrenched in the enzyme structure, which allows for pervasive interactions with both neighboring atoms and conserved water molecules. Additionally, this flavin-containing prosthetic group has been classified as providing snake venom with its quintessential dark yellow coloration, which is shown in Figure 2.

One unusual characteristic reported for sv-LAAOs regards the cold inactivation and heat reactivation properties of the protein. Thereby, most sv-LAAOs are considered to be thermolabile enzymes.

This enzyme belongs to the family of oxidoreductases, specifically those acting on the CH-NH2 group of donors with oxygen as acceptor. The systematic name of this enzyme class is L-amino-acid:oxygen oxidoreductase (deaminating). This enzyme is also called ophio-amino-acid oxidase.

Biological Function

Specificity
The specific activities of sv-LAAOs with various L-amino acids have been explored. Many studies show that a number of sv-LAAOs exhibit a preference for hydrophobic L-amino acids as substrates. For example, results have indicated that most sv-LAAOs demonstrate relatively high specificities toward hydrophobic amino acids such as  L-Met, L-Leu, and L-Ile in addition to aromatic amino acids such as L-Phe and L-Trp.

Activity
This enzyme participates in 8 metabolic pathways: alanine and aspartate metabolism, methionine metabolism, valine, leucine and isoleucine degradation, tyrosine metabolism, phenylalanine metabolism, tryptophan metabolism, phenylalanine, tyrosine and tryptophan biosynthesis, and alkaloid biosynthesis. It employs one cofactor, flavin adenine dinucleotide (FAD). The enzyme binds to FAD in the first step of the catalytic process, thereby reducing FAD to FADH2. The FAD is regenerated from FADH2 by oxidation as a result of O2 being reduced to H2O2.  The mechanism proceeds via oxidative deamination of the L-amino acid, which affords an imino acid intermediate. Following hydrolysis of the intermediate, the enzyme successfully affords the 2-oxo acid, as shown in Scheme 1.

A variety of biological activities have been discovered from isolated sv-LAAOs including cytotoxic, antibacterial, antiviral, and antiparasitic activities as well as platelet aggregation effects. These activities can be defined by the enzyme's ability to provoke oxidative stress by forming oxygen radicals and hydrogen peroxide. The particular mechanism of action of sv-LAAOs in terms of platelet aggregation has been determined less clear, because some sv-LAAOs are known to create aggregates and some are known to be anti-aggregating factors.

In recent studies, it has been shown that LAAOs have been isolated from the skin and/or gill mucous secretions of rockfish, great sculpin, and flounder. The presence of these enzymes were identified to be a unique type of antibacterial protein in the external defense employed by certain fish species.

Hydrogen Peroxide Formation
Notably, because of its potential in relevant antimicrobial, anti-tumor cell, and/or consumption of amino acids, the interest of researching sv-LAAOs has begun to grow. Many authors have investigated the mechanism of antibacterial action of sv-LAAO.  It is well established that sv-LAAO kills and breaks down bacteria by the H2O2 that is produced as a result of the oxidation reaction occurring in the surrounding environment.

In one case study, it was reported that the sv-LAAO (isolated from C. durissus cascavella venom) caused the rupture of bacteria membranes while promoting extravasation, or leakage, of plasmatic contents out of the cellular structure. They argued that the amount of hydrogen peroxide generated was sufficient to inhibit bacterial growth, and that the ability of the enzyme to bind to bacterial membranes is not important in its antibacterial activity.

Disease Relevance

Cardiovascular Disease
Cardiovascular disease can present itself in many different forms, from cardiomyopathy to peripheral arterial disease, and heart disease remains a key threat to human health.  While there are means of therapy to both prevent and cure cardiovascular diseases, many drugs are unavailable for clinical use due to severe side effects in addition to high toxicity levels. However, in the past decade, sv-LAAOs have shown promise in affecting platelet aggregation. It has been proposed that hydrogen peroxide is considered to play a significant role regarding the enzymes ability to both cause and prevent this platelet aggregation. With this knowledge, it appears that sv-LAAOs could be evaluated as a potential cardiovascular disease therapeutic because of their biological potency.

Venom-Induced Pathology
As a consequence of the numerous activities the enzyme participates in, it could be deduced that there is likely some enzymatic function regarding the complex network of venom toxin activities. However, the role of sv-LAAOs in venom-induced pathology has not reported to be sufficiently assessed.

Evolution
By virtue of its antibacterial properties, it has been speculated that sv-LAAOs are in part responsible for the maintenance and stabilization of both the venom and venom gland in snake species.

References

Further reading

See also 
 Snake venom
 Oxidoreductase
 Oxidative deamination
 D-amino acid oxidase

EC 1.4.3
Flavoproteins
Enzymes of known structure
Hydrogen peroxide